Fico's Cabinet may refer to:
Fico's First Cabinet, 2006-2010
Fico's Second Cabinet, 2012-2016
Fico's Third Cabinet, 2026-2018